The 1980 FIA European Formula 3 Championship was the sixth edition of the FIA European Formula 3 Championship. The championship consisted of 14 rounds across the continent. The season was won by Italian Michele Alboreto, with Thierry Boutsen second and Corrado Fabi in third.

Calendar

Results

Championship standings

Drivers' championship

References

External links 

1980 in motorsport
FIA European Formula 3 Championship